John Adams (August 26, 1778 – September 25, 1854) was an American lawyer and politician who served one term as a United States Congressman from New York from 1833 to 1835.

Life
John  studied law, and taught school in Durham. John was admitted to the bar in 1805, and began to practice in Durham. John  was Surrogate of Greene County, New York from 1810 to 1811.

Political career 
He was a member of the New York State Assembly in 1812–13.

Congress 
In April 1814, John  ran as a Federalist for the 14th United States Congress, and was declared elected due to a mistake made by the deputy county clerk who had transcribed the returns. Credentials were issued by the Secretary of State of New York, but John Adams did not take or claim the seat. His Democratic-Republican opponent Erastus Root contested Adams's election and was seated on December 26, 1815.

John Adams was elected as a Jacksonian to the 23rd Congress, and served from March 4, 1833 to March 3, 1835.

Later career and death 
Afterwards he resumed his law practice in Catskill. John also became a director of the Canajoharie and Catskill Railroad in 1835.

John was buried at the Thompson Street Cemetery in Catskill.

Family 
State Senator Platt Adams (1792–1887) was his brother.

References
Who Was Who in America, Historical Volume, 1607-1896. Chicago: Marquis Who's Who, 1963.
 Congress Bio
 Political Graveyard
The New York Civil List compiled by Franklin Benjamin Hough (pages 72, 187, 255 and 414; Weed, Parsons and Co., 1858)

1778 births
1854 deaths
People from Durham, New York
Members of the New York State Assembly
Schoolteachers from New York (state)
People from the Catskills
New York (state) state court judges
19th-century American railroad executives
New York (state) Federalists
Jacksonian members of the United States House of Representatives from New York (state)
19th-century American politicians
Members of the United States House of Representatives from New York (state)